A with breve may refer to:

A with breve (Cyrillic) (Ӑ, ă), a Chuvash letter
Ă or A with breve (Latin) (Ă, ă), a Romanian and Vietnamese letter